The 2013–14 or XXII Ukrainian Hockey Championship was the 22nd annual edition of the Ukrainian Hockey Championship. Following the 2012–13 PHL season, national championship returned under the authority of Ice Hockey Federation of Ukraine (FHU) after two seasons were held by Professional Hockey League (PHL). The season concluded in a playoff series in March 2014.

Regular season 

 Vinnytski Haidamaky were withdrawn because of constant failure to appear for their matches due to financial problems. All their results (six games) were canceled.

Points are awarded as follows:
*3 Points for a win in regulation ("W")
*2 Points for a win in overtime ("OTW") or a penalty shootout ("SOW")
*1 Point for a loss in overtime ("OTL") or a penalty shootout ("SOL")
*0 Points for a loss in regulation ("L")

Playoffs

Bracket

Semifinals 
HC Levy - HC Kompanion-Naftogaz 0-2 (2:6, 1:6)
Sokil Kyiv - Bilyi Bars 0-2 (1:2, 1:6)

Final 
HC Kompanion-Naftogaz - Bilyi Bars 3-2 (3:1, 2:1, 1:3, 1:3, 2:1)

References

Ukrainian Hockey Championship seasons
Ukrainian Hockey Championship
Ukr